Persian wine, also called Mey and Badeh, is a cultural symbol and tradition in Iran (Persia), and has a significant presence in Persian mythology, Persian poetry and Persian miniatures.

History
Recent archaeological research has pushed back the date of the known origin of wine making in Persia far beyond that which writers earlier in the 20th century had envisaged. Excavations at the Godin Tepe site in the Zagros mountains (Badler, 1995; McGovern and Michel, 1995; McGovern, 2003), have revealed pottery vessels dating from c. 3100–2900 BC containing tartaric acid, almost certainly indicating the former presence of wine. Even earlier evidence was found at the site of Hajji Firuz Tepe, also in the Zagros mountains. Here, McGovern et al. (1996) used chemical analyses of the residue of a Neolithic jar dating from as early as 5400–5000 BC to indicate high levels of tartaric acid, again suggesting that the fluid contained therein had been made from grapes.

Pre-Islamic period
The modern historian Rudi Matthee explains that in Zoroastrianism wine was a symbol for liquid gold as well as the moving fire of the radiant sun. Therefore, wine held a ritual function in Zoroastrianism, being part of a liberation ritual, in which it substituted for blood. Matthee adds that the history of the Iranian elite of ancient and late antique Iran "could be written as the history of razm va bazm (fighting and feasting), with wine at the centre".

Islamic period
Wine drinking was prominent in Classical Islam, from Al-Andalus in the west to Khorasan in the east. The Iranian Saffarid and Samanid rulers, the first to look for autonomy from their Abbasid suzerains, were known, as Matthee explains, "for the gusto with which they and their entourage indulged in wine-drinking." The 11th-century Qabus-nama, written by Keikavus of the Ziyarid dynasty, explicitly records that the Quran prohibits wine consumption, yet also states advice (same goes for Nizam al-Mulk's Siyasatnama) on what the proper fashion is for drinking wine while also taking it for granted that wine will be served at feasts.

The English traveller and writer Thomas Herbert wrote in 1627 about the difference between wine consumption of the Ottomans and Iranians. According to Herbert, the Ottomans, who, although were prohibited to drink wine by law, still drank it covertly. The Iranians on the other hand, Herbert asserted, since a long period of time, drunk wine openly and with excess. According to the French traveller Jean Chardin, who was in 17th-century Safavid Iran, drinking was mainly done in order to get drunk fast hence the appreciation of Iranians for strong wines.

Alcoholic drinks were commonly drunk amongst the elite, and Muslims often visited the taverns; however, alcohol was "formally outlawed", hence it could not operate in the reality of everyday life. Thus, in turn, as Matthee explains, the drinking of wine "became a metaphor for the ardent feelings of the lover for the beloved in the imaginary world of (mystical) poetry".

In modern Iran, wine cannot be  produced legally due to the prohibition of alcohol. Before the Islamic Revolution in 1979, there were up to 300 wineries in Iran; now there are none. As a whole, Iran is no longer a wine-producing country, but Iranian Christians are legally allowed to ferment wine.

Legends and myths
According to Iranian legend, wine was discovered by a girl despondent over her rejection by the king. The girl decided to commit suicide by drinking the spoiled residue left by rotting table grapes. Instead of poisoning the girl, the fermented must caused her to pass out to awaken the next morning with the realization that life was worth living. She reported back to the king her discovery of the intoxicating qualities of the spoiled grape juice and was rewarded for her find.

Depiction in Persian miniatures
Miniature painting in Persia developed into a sophisticated art in which the most important element that all these paintings share is their subjects. The subjects that are mainly chosen from Hafez’s “Ghazaliyat” or Khayyam’s Rubaiyat. Therefore, the Persian wine, Mey, and Persian wine server (or cup bearer), Saghi, are essential parts to a majority of these paintings. Usually, the old man in the painting is Hafez or Khayyam, who, having left his scholarly position and books behind, is now drunk in Kharabat (a mystical rundown tavern located in a remote and poor corner of town) or in Golshan (garden) drinking wine from the hands of gorgeous Saghis. 

In Persian poetry, grapes and wine appear frequently with symbolic, metaphorical, and actual meanings.

See also

 Alcohol in Iran
 Persian culture
 Shirazi wine
 Beer in Iran

References

Sources

Further reading
 Willem Floor, “The Culture of Wine Drinking in Pre-Mongol Iran,” in Wine Culture in Iran and Beyond, ed. Bert G. Fragner, Ralph Kauz, and Florian Schwarz (Vienna: Verlag der Österreichischen Akademie der Wissenschaften, 2014), 165-209

External links 
Persian wine tradition and symbolism: Evidence from the medieval poetry of Hafiz
The History of Wine: It all started in Iran in the Zagros Mountains.
Depiction of Wine in Persian Miniature

Wine
Ancient wine
Wine by country
Wine regions
Iranian inventions